Ngāti Huarere is a Maori iwi. It descends from Huarere, who arrived via the Arawa in the 14th century.

History 
The Ngāti Huarere iwi was established by Huarere in the mid to late 14th century, from which time it inhabited the Moehau Range, in the Coromandel Peninsula. Before they took over this area, it was inhabited by descendants of Mokoterea, with whom the Ngāti Huarere intermarried.

12 generations later, the Ngāti Huarere began settling Te Tātua a Riukiuta. They subsumed the Ngāti Riukiuta who already resided there.

Before the Marutūāhu confederation expanded into the Coromandel Peninsula, the Ngati Huarere consisted four main hapu:

 Ngati Pare, residing at Whangapoua.
 Ngati Piri and Ngati Koheri, residing at Manaia harbour.
 Ngati Raukatauri, residing at the coast around Moehau.
At one point, the Ngati Huarere were also described as having a fifth (minor?) hapu,  the Ngati Hinu, somewhere along the west coast.

At one point, the Ngāti Huarere waged a war with the Ngāti Hei. The Ngāti Tamaterā (a member of the Marutūāhu confederation) assisted the Ngāti Huarere, for which the Ngāti Huarere awarded them the territory of Harataunga, which they had previously inhabited.

By the middle of the 16th century, after or prior to the Ngāti Huarere-Ngāti Hei conflict (chronology uncertain), Ruamano was a chief of the Ngāti Huarere. Ruamano would find himself at war with the Ngāti Tamaterā following the death of a tribesman named Mahanga at the hands of the Ngāti Huarere. This war resulted in the Moehau Range being abandoned by the Ngāti Huarere, who emigrated to the north to unite with the Te Kapotai tribe (inhabiting the Hokianga and Bay of Island district). The Ngati Rauakatauri (a Ngāti Huarere hapu) continued to occupy parts of the Coromandel Peninsula.

References 

Iwi and hapū
Ngāti Huarere